Beloeil or Belœil may refer to:
 Beloeil, Belgium, a municipality in Hainaut, Belgium
Château of Belœil
Beloeil, Quebec, a city in Quebec, Canada
Mont Saint-Hilaire or Mont Beloeil, Quebec, Canada